John Middleton (9 January 182711 November 1856) was an English artist known for his accomplished watercolour paintings. He was the youngest and the last important member of the Norwich School of painters, which was the first provincial art movement in Britain. As well as being a talented etcher, he produced oil paintings and was an enthusiastic amateur photographer.

Middleton's father, also named John, was a Norwich glass stainer. His mother painted plants and twice exhibited her work with the Norwich Society of Artists. Middleton was educated in Norwich and studied art under the landscape painters John Berney Ladbrooke and Henry Bright.  He first exhibited his paintings before the age of twenty and went on to show paintings at both the Royal Academy and the British Institution. Many of his works have been acclaimed by art historians for their masterly tonal values, confidence and freshness, which gives them a more modern appearance in comparison with the sometimes over-detailed works of other Victorian painters.

Middleton's death in 1856 from tuberculosis, which cut short his career at the age of 29,  has been described by the art historian Josephine Walpole as "the supreme tragedy for the Norwich School of painters".

Background

The Norwich School of painters, which included Middleton, was a group connected by geographical location, the depiction of Norwich and rural Norfolk, and by close personal and professional relationships. The school's most important artists were John Crome, Joseph Stannard, George Vincent, Robert Ladbrooke, James Stark, John Thirtle and John Sell Cotman, along with Cotman's sons Miles Edmund and John Joseph Cotman, and Middleton himself. The Norwich School was a unique phenomenon in the history of 19th-century British art. Norwich was the first English city outside London where a school of artists arose, creating the first provincial art movement in Britain. It had more local-born artists than any subsequently-formed school elsewhere. Norwich's theatrical, artistic, philosophical and musical cultures were cross-fertilised in a way that was unique outside London.

Within the Norwich School was the Norwich Society of Artists, founded in 1803. It arose from the need for a group of Norwich artists to teach each other and their pupils. Though not all of the members of the Norwich School were also members of the Norwich Society, the latter was key in establishing the artists' associations with each other. Its stated aims were "to conduct an Enquiry into the Rise, Progress and Present State of Painting, Archaeology and Sculpture with a view to point out the Best Methods of Study to attain to Greater Perfection in these Arts". It held regular exhibitions and had an organised structure, showing works annually until 1825 and again from 1828 until it was dissolved in 1833. The leading spirits and finest artists of the movement were Crome and Cotman.

John Middleton, who was too young to have had any association with the Norwich Society of Artists, was the last great watercolourist of the Norwich School and the most gifted of the school's third generation of artists. His works provided, according to Andrew Moore, the former Keeper of Art at the Norwich Castle Museum & Art Gallery, "a distinguished coda to the spirit of his immediate contemporaries and the artists of the first generation, John Sell Cotman and John Crome".

Interest in the Norwich School declined during the 1830s, but the school's reputation rose after the Royal Academy's 1878 Winter Exhibition. By the end of the century, however, its paintings—once regarded as modern and progressive—were seen as belonging to a bygone age. This has been attributed by the art professor Andrew Hemingway to the "mythology of rural Englishness" that prevailed at the start of the 20th century. He has commented on a lack of analysis of the Norwich School, such as connections between the Norwich School painters and other artists and developments in landscape painting during the 19th century.

Life

Early life and training

Parish records show that John Middleton was born in Norwich on 9 January 1827 and was baptised on 14 January at St Stephen's Church, by his parents John Middleton and Ann Bayfield. Little of his early childhood has been documented and his biographers do not mention any siblings, although the Middletons' memorial in St Stephen's Church includes an unnamed daughter who died in infancy. Some of the family's relatives in Norwich were blacksmiths and weavers, but John Middleton senior was a glass stainer. He was the business successor of Daniel Coppin, one of the founding members of the Norwich Society of Artists. In addition to running a glass colouring business, Middleton senior undertook plumbing and painting work, and studied and collected ferns in his spare time. His wife specialised in painting plants, and as 'Mrs. J. Middleton' exhibited two pictures with the Norwich Society: Cactus Speciocissimus, flowered in the greenhouse of Mr. C. Middleton, April 1828 and Georgina, or Dahlias from Nature (1829). Ann Middleton died in Norwich on 1 January 1830, aged 29.

Middleton was educated at Norwich Grammar School. Upon the completion of his formal education he became the pupil of the landscape painter John Berney Ladbrooke, who referred to "my pupil John Middleton" in a letter dated 11 February 1850. Ladbrooke, a Norwich School artist who produced a large output of works despite having to earn a living as a drawing master, particularly influenced Middleton's oil technique.

Middleton was taught by Henry Bright, whom he visited in London in 1847. Middleton moved to the capital at this time, living at 1, The Terrace, Kensington. From 1847 to 1849 he was both the pupil and friend of Bright, probably travelling with him on a trip to Kent.

Following his father's death in April 1848, Middleton moved back to Norwich in order to take over the running of the family business. His duties as a businessman both interrupted his training and acted to reduce his artistic output. In 1850 he moved with his step-mother from their house adjoining the business to a much larger house in Surrey Street, around the corner from the business in St Stephen's Street.

Artistic career and friendships

Middleton was a precocious artist, exhibiting before he was twenty. He exhibited in London from 1847 to 1855, despite the interruption caused by his business commitments: he showed fourteen pictures at the Royal Academy and fifteen at the British Institution, where his work was acclaimed.

Middleton's artistic output was influenced by (and in turn had an influence upon) the works of Henry Bright, Thomas Lound and Robert Leman. The four artists were very good friends.

According to the author and art historian William Frederick Dickes, Middleton was the devoted young friend of Lound, who probably introduced him to the works of Thirtle, as well as to photography. Lound worked as a brewer clerk and an insurance agent, whose wealth allowed him to pursue his enthusiasm for collecting, copying and producing art. He was especially passionate about Thirtle's paintings. Along with Middleton, Bright and Leman, Lound was a member of the Committee of the Norfolk and Norwich Association for the Promotion of the Fine Arts (18481852). A central figure in the history of the Norwich School watercolour painters, the remaining Norwich artists depended on the leadership of Lound (and Leman) for three decades after the demise of the Norwich Society of Artists in 1833.

Middleton befriended William Johnson Jennis Bolding, a resident landowner and farmer in the coastal village of Weybourne. Bolding, known for his pioneering photographs of Norfolk landscapes and estate workers, is regarded as an important early photographer. Middleton was responsible for enrolling him as a member of the Norwich Photographic Society, which held exhibitions that included William Bolding's work. Bolding was also a talented artist who exhibited two oil paintings in 1853. The two friends sketched together, with Middleton often staying at Weybourne, and some of Bolding's landscape photographs have an affinity with Middleton's watercolour technique. A small etching by John Middleton, made en plein air, closely resembles a photograph by Bolding, showing that the friends were working together. Some of Bolding's landscape photographs that show trees, and trees near water, were photographed with a typical Middleton-like composition, with one particular image containing many of the ingredients found in Middleton's watercolours, such as trees, water, fences and a gate.

Although Henry Bright was Middleton's teacher, the outstanding watercolours Bright produced in the 1840s made after a sketching tour of Kent, when he was possibly accompanied by Middleton, show clearly how he was influenced by his pupil. It often difficult to distinguish between the two artists. According to the art historian Francis Cheetham, Lane over the Hill shows Bright's capacity to "use watercolour with (the) freshness and simplicity which characterises the finest work of John Middleton". Their friendship was not always smooth: in a letter of 22 February 1850 to Thomas Lound's son, Bright wrote, "J. Middleton dined here tonight, he was wondrous polite. Tell your good papa that my Lecture did him good."

Middleton travelled to various parts of Britain during his working life. As well as spending time sketching and painting during an excursion to Tunbridge Wells in Kent, he produced paintings of the area around Clovelly during a visit to the Devon coast. Included amongst works he exhibited in London were Scene near Tunbridge Wells (1847) and Clovelly, on the coast of Devonshire (1851). Whilst in London he and other members of the Norwich School attended the evening meetings of the Graphic Society of Painters and Engravers. He became a member of the Society in 1854, but resigned in 1856, shortly before his death.

Decline and death

During much of his life Middleton suffered from poor health. He became consumptive and was forced to work outdoors less and less as his illness advanced. The art historian Derek Clifford noted that Middleton's inspiration, brilliant colours and confidence in his drawings tailed away after 1848, four years before his last known drawings were made.

Middleton died of tuberculosis at his home at 29, Surrey Street, Norwich, on 11 November 1856. He was buried in the new cemetery at Earlham. His obituary in the local Norfolk press noted that "he painted nature just as he found her in the quiet sequestered nooks which abound in this county, and many a spot, otherwise of little note, will live long on the canvas touched by Middleton’s hand". His will, which was proved in Norwich in July 1857, stipulated that Mary Middleton should inherit both the family business and the remaining funds from the estate. From his estate, which was assessed at under £30,000, he provided for his servants, his relatives and to charities, including the Norfolk and Norwich Hospital, which received £100.

The author Josephine Walpole believes that "the supreme tragedy for the Norwich School was the death of John Middleton at the age of only 29" and that the later works of the most gifted of the school's watercolour artists only "lost their fire and life" because of the debilitating effect of his illness. According to Hemingway, Middleton's death in 1856 marked a decline in the quality of painting produced in the region, and he was the last significant watercolourist to be based in East Anglia.

Works

There is no published catalogue raisonné of John Middleton's drawings, pictures or photographs. An idea of his artistic output can be obtained from the catalogue of a sale of his works that took place in June 1883, following the death of Mary Middleton earlier that year. On sale were 108 sketches (including a series made by Middleton when he was Ladbrooke's pupil), 108 pencil drawings, 4 sketch books, more than 40 etchings, 63 watercolour paintings, 11 oils and 20 oil painting sketches.

Watercolours, oil paintings and etchings

John Middleton was a highly talented watercolourist, who according to Clifford, was the most successful of all the Norwich School artists working in this medium during the late 1840s, with the possible exception of John Sell Cotman. Middleton produced works using clear colours and incisively-outlined forms, boldly using the white of his paper and being, in Clifford's words, "delighted in the potentialities of his medium". The author Robert Brall considers Middleton's best paintings to have an "astonishingly modern" look, in comparison with the elaborate detail found in contemporary works. Brall notes that Middleton's more laboured paintings, painted from 1850, lacked much of the fresh and spontaneous appearance of his earlier works, probably because of a growing public interest in art that contained fine detail and an elaborate 'finished' look'.

Writing in 1905, Dickes described Middleton as a painstaking and energetic artist. The Dictionary of National Biography noted his "effective rendering of the seasons of the year, especially the early spring". Walpole has assessed his approach to his work as being more advanced than that of his contemporaries Robert Leman and Thomas Lound. Commentators have praised his ability to show tone in his paintings. According to Josephine Walpole, Middleton's "exquisite use of light and shade enhances the mastery of tonal values", a comment that echoes the Norfolk Chronicle′s report of 11 December 1847, which described his "charming use of light and shade".

His etchings required a different technique from his watercolours: their delicacy and intricacy are said by the author Geoffrey Searle to resemble the work of John Crome. In contrast to his watercolours, his etchings are mostly depictions of wooded landscapes, ranging in tone from those that are heavily inked, to others with a light, silvery touch and delicate lines. None of them depict human figures. A set was published separately in 1852 as Nine Etchings by John Middleton, now held at the British Museum and Norwich Castle. He also painted in oils, but little has been written of his oil paintings, whose subject matter was similar to his watercolours and which displayed a similar immediacy of execution.

Photographic work
Middleton took a great interest in photography and was an early committee member of the Norwich Photographic Society, which was formed in 1854. He was one of the earliest artists to use a camera as an aid to producing watercolour landscapes, working in the medium whilst it was still in its infancy. Like Lound, who was also a keen amateur photographer, he possessed his own equipment, which at that time only the wealthy could afford.

Middleton used waxed paper negatives to produce his images of the Norfolk countryside. It is not known if he sold any of his photographs or displayed them in any major exhibition. The only photographs that can be attributed to him are a group made during a trip to North Wales. His landscape photographs are reminiscent in their contrasting dark and light tones of the large paintings produced by Bright in the late 1840s, such as Study of a Beech Tree.

Norwich's photographic community, centered around Thomas Damant Eaton ( 17991871), was particularly active during the 1850s. During this period a close relationship existed between the artistic community and Norfolk photographers. An indication of this relationship was a major exhibition of works by both the Norfolk and Norwich Arts Association and the Norwich Photographic Society from November 1856 to February 1857, in which 500 photographs and 425 works of art were shown. It took place only four years after the first large public exhibition of photographs in the world. Middleton died shortly before the Norwich exhibition was opened, and its catalogue shows that none of his works were shown.

Exhibitions and sales
Middleton's works have been included in fine art exhibitions in both London and Norwich: 
Exhibitions of the Norfolk and Norwich Association for the Promotion of the Fine Arts (1848, 1849, 1852, 1853 and 1855)
British Institution exhibitions (18471855)
Royal Academy exhibitions (18471855)
Exhibition of the Works of Deceased Local Artists, Norfolk and Norwich Fine Arts Association (1860)
Norwich and Eastern Counties Working Classes Industrial Exhibition (1867)
British Medical Association Loan Collection (1874)
Norwich Art Loan Exhibition, Church of St Peter Mancroft Restoration Fund (1878 and 1885)
Fine Art Exhibition, in aid of the new Norfolk and Norwich Hospital (1883)
Loan Collection of Drawings in the New Picture Gallery, Norwich Castle (1903)
Exhibition of Norwich School Pictures, Norwich Castle Museum (October 1927)
Exhibition at the Bankside Gallery in London from 25 May to 27 June 1982 

Few of Middleton's paintings can be seen on public display outside the Norwich area. Several of his works have been sold at auction. His undated At Gunton Park (33 x 47.6 cm), which was sold at Chiswick Auctions in 2018, fetched £3,500. The etching At Hatfield (11 x 16.3 cm) was sold by Keys in 2016, for £120. A shady lane, Tunbridge Wells, Kent realised £6,675 at Christie's in London in July 2012, whilst another watercolour, An old cottage at Tunbridge Wells, Kent, realised £18,000 when sold there in 2007.

Gallery

Notes

References

Bibliography

External links 

21 works by John Middleton in the Norfolk Museums Collections
Early Norfolk Photographs 1840 - 1860 John Middleton
John Middleton - Suffolk Artists website
24 works by John Middleton in the British Museum
12 works by John Middleton in the Yale Center for British Art
Auction results for works by John Middleton on ArtNet (December 2018)

19th-century English painters
English male painters
People educated at Norwich School
1827 births
1856 deaths
Artists from Norwich
19th-century English male artists